"Last Night's Letter" is a song written by Gloria E Harvey, Phillip L Stewart, Cedric R Hailey and recorded by K-Ci & JoJo that was their second single from their debut album, Love Always. MCA Records released that single on September 16, 1997.

Charts

References 

1997 singles
1997 songs
K-Ci & JoJo songs
MCA Records singles
Songs written by K-Ci